Andris is a Latvian masculine given name, a cognate of Andrew, and may refer to:
Andris Ambainis (born 1975), Latvian computer scientist
Andris Ameriks (born 1961) Latvian politician and economist 
Andris Andreiko (1942-1976), Latvian world champion and European champion Draughts player
Andris Ārgalis (born 1944), Latvian politician
Andris Bērziņš (born 1944), Latvian politician, former President of Latvia
Andris Bērziņš (born 1951), Latvian politician, former Prime Minister of Latvia
Andris Biedriņš (born 1986), Latvian basketball player
Andris Blicavs (born 1954), Australian basketball player
Andris Džeriņš (born 1988), Latvian ice hockey player
Andris Hernández (born 1982), Venezuelan track and road racing cyclist
Andris Keišs (born 1974), Latvian stage and film actor
Andris Lapsa (born 1968), Latvian footballer
Andris Liepa (born 1962), Latvian ballet dancer
Andris Misters (born 1992), Latvian basketball player
Andris Naudužs (born 1975), Latvian racing cyclist and Olympic competitor
Andris Nelsons (born 1978), Latvian conductor
Andris Ozols (born 1968), Latvian businessman and government official
Andris Piebalgs (born 1957), Latvian politician and diplomat
Andris Poga (born 1980), Latvian conductor
Andris Reinholds (born 1971), Latvian rower 
Andris Reiss (born 1978), Latvian cyclist and Olympic competitor
Andris Šics (born 1985), Latvian luger and Olympic medalist 
Andris Siksnis (born 1993), Latvian ice hockey player 
Andris Šķēle (born 1958), Latvian politician, businessman, former Prime Minister of Latvia 
Andris Smirnovs (born 1990), Latvian cyclist
Andris Teikmanis (born 1959), Latvian jurist, politician, diplomat and former Mayor of Riga
Andris Treimanis (born 1985), Latvian football referee
Andris Vaņins (born 1980), Latvian football goalkeeper 
Andris Vilks (born 1963), Latvian politician
Andris Vosekalns (born 1992),  Latvian road cyclist

Latvian masculine given names